The Kalumburu Road in the Kimberley region of Western Australia is a 267 kilometre unsealed road that connects the Gibb River Road to the Aboriginal community of Kalumburu on the coast via the Mitchell Plateau. The road, which often becomes inaccessible during the wet season, is suitable for four-wheel drive traffic and facilities are limited to supplies available at the roadhouse at the Drysdale River Station. Kalumburu Road runs north from the Gibb River Road, which it intersects approximately 250 km west of Kununurra. It also provides visitors access to Mitchell Falls.

See also

References

	

Australian outback tracks
Kimberley (Western Australia)